The 2010 National Basketball Association Summer League (NBA Summer League) was a pro basketball league ran by the NBA in the United States just following the 2010 NBA draft. Teams consisted of players who have been in the league for three years or fewer as well as newly drafted talent. It gives rookies a chance to practice against other players that are new to the NBA. All 30 NBA teams participated besides an NBA D-League Select team so the total number of teams is 31 with each team playing 5 games except Sacramento Kings which played 6 games. It was held in Las Vegas, Nevada and Orlando, Florida from July 5 through July 18. 2010.

Standings

Las Vegas games

Orlando games

Leaders

Points

Rebounds

Assists

Rookie leaders

Awards
 Summer League MVP: John Wall

External links
 Official website

2010
Basketball in Las Vegas
Summer